The 1917 St. Louis Browns season involved the Browns finishing seventh in the American League with a record of 57 wins and 97 losses.

Regular season

Season standings

Record vs. opponents

Roster

Game log 

|- align="center" bgcolor="#ffbbbb"
| 1 || April 11 || White Sox || 2–7 || Scott || Hamilton || Danforth || || || 0–1|| || 
|- align="text-align:center; bgcolor="#bbffbb" 
| 2 || April 13 || White Sox|| 3–4 || Koob || Faber || Sothoron || || || || – || 
|- align="center" bgcolor="#ffbbbb"
| 3 || April 14 || White Sox || 0–11 || Cicotte
| Hamilton || || || || || 
|- align=
| 4 || April 15 || Indians || ||
| || || || || || 
|- align=
| 5 || April 17 || Indians || ||
| || || || || || 
|- align=
| 6 || April 18 || Indians || ||
| || || || || || 
|- align=
| 7 || April 19 || White Sox|| ||
| || || || || || 
|- align=
| 8 || April 20 || White Sox|| ||
| || || || || || 
|- align=
| 9 || April 21 || White Sox|| ||
| || || || || || 
|- align=
| 10 || April 22 || White Sox|| ||
| || || || || || 
|- align=
| 11 || April 24 || Tigers|| ||
| || || || || || 
|- align=
| 13 || April 27 || Indians|| ||
| || || || || || 
|- align=
| 14 || April 28 || Indians|| ||
| || || || || || 
|-

Player stats

Batting

Starters by position 
Note: Pos = Position; G = Games played; AB = At bats; H = Hits; Avg. = Batting average; HR = Home runs; RBI = Runs batted in

Other batters 
Note: G = Games played; AB = At bats; H = Hits; Avg. = Batting average; HR = Home runs; RBI = Runs batted in

Pitching

Starting pitchers 
Note: G = Games pitched; IP = Innings pitched; W = Wins; L = Losses; ERA = Earned run average; SO = Strikeouts

Other pitchers 
Note: G = Games pitched; IP = Innings pitched; W = Wins; L = Losses; ERA = Earned run average; SO = Strikeouts

Relief pitchers 
Note: G = Games pitched; W = Wins; L = Losses; SV = Saves; ERA = Earned run average; SO = Strikeouts

References 
 1917 St. Louis Browns team page at Baseball Reference
 1917 St. Louis Browns season at baseball-almanac.com

St. Louis Browns seasons
Saint Louis Browns season
St Louis